The 1946 Albanian National Championship was the ninth season of the Albanian National Championship, the top professional league for association football clubs, since its establishment in 1930.

Overview
It was contested by 12 teams, and Vllaznia won the championship.

Regular season

Group A

Note: '17 Nëntori' is KF Tirana and 'Ylli i Kuq Durrës' is Teuta

Group B

Note: 'Bashkimi Elbasanas' is KS Elbasani, 'Shqiponja' is Luftëtari, 'Spartak Kuçova' is Naftëtari

Finals

References
Albania - List of final tables (RSSSF)

Kategoria Superiore seasons
1
Albania
Albania